Kingsley Academy (formerly Hounslow Manor School) is an 11–18 mixed, secondary school and sixth form with academy status in Hounslow, Greater London, England. It is part of the Academies Enterprise Trust via its London Academies Enterprise Trust.

References

External links 
 

Secondary schools in the London Borough of Hounslow
Academies in the London Borough of Hounslow
Academies Enterprise Trust